In the Bible, Lot's wife is a figure first mentioned in . The Book of Genesis describes how she became a pillar of salt after she looked back at Sodom. She is not named in the Bible but is called "Ado" or "Edith" in some Jewish traditions. She is also referred to in the deuterocanonical books at the Book of Wisdom and the New Testament at Luke 17:32.

Genesis narrative 

The story of Lot's wife begins in  after two angels arrived in Sodom at eventide and were invited to spend the night at Lot's home. The men of Sodom were exceedingly wicked and prompted Lot to offer up these men/angels; instead, Lot offered up his two daughters but they were refused. As dawn was breaking, Lot's visiting angels urged him to get his family and flee, so as to avoid being caught in the impending disaster for the iniquity of the city. The command was given, "Flee for your life! Do not look behind you, nor stop anywhere in the Plain; flee to the hills, lest you be swept away." While fleeing, Lot's wife looked behind her at Sodom and was turned into a pillar of salt.

Composition
Her looking back at Sodom differs in word usage from Abraham "looking" , šāqap toward Sodom in (18:16).

Pillar of salt

The story appears to be based in part on a folk legend explaining a geographic feature.

A pillar of salt named "Lot's wife" is located near the Dead Sea at Mount Sodom in Israel. The Mishnah states that a blessing should be said at the place where the pillar of salt is. The term "Lot's wife" for such geographical features subsequently entered common parlance, as one of the outcrops comprising Long Ya Men was also nicknamed thus.

The Jewish historian Josephus claimed to have seen the pillar of salt which was Lot's wife. Its existence is also attested to by the early church fathers Clement of Rome and Irenaeus.

Jewish commentaries
In Judaism, one common view of Lot's wife turning to salt was as punishment for disobeying the angels' warning. By looking back at the "evil cities," she betrayed her secret longing for that way of life. She was deemed unworthy to be saved and thus was turned to a pillar of salt.

Another view in the Jewish exegesis of Genesis 19:26, is that when Lot's wife looked back, she turned to a pillar of salt upon the "sight of God" descending to rain destruction upon Sodom and Gomorrah.  One reason given in the tradition is that she looked behind her to see if her daughters, married to men of Sodom, were coming or not.

Another Jewish legend says that because Lot's wife sinned with salt, she was punished with salt. On the night the two angels visited Lot, he requested that his wife prepare a feast for them. Not having any salt, Lot's wife asked her neighbors for some, which alerted them to the presence of their guests, resulting in the mob action that endangered Lot's family.

In the Midrash, Lot's wife's name is given as Ado or Edith.

Islamic view

Lut in the Quran is considered to be the same as Lot in the Hebrew Bible. He is considered to be a messenger of God and a prophet of God.

In the Quranic telling, Lut warned his people of their imminent destruction lest they change their wicked ways, but they refused to listen to him. Lut was ordered by Allah to flee the city with his followers at night, but to leave his wife behind. As soon as he left, Allah brought down upon them a shower of stones of clay.

The difference between this telling and the Judeo-Christian telling from the Book of Genesis is that Lut's wife was destroyed alongside the wicked; in other words, she did not flee with Lut. This is because Lut's wife was as guilty as those who were punished. So much so, that she is mentioned in the Quran alongside Nuh's wife as two impious and disbelieving women who were punished for their wickedness, irrespective of their being married to prophets.

In the Quran, surah (chapter) 26 Ash-Shu'ara (The Poets) –

Other biblical references
Lot's wife is also referred to in the apocrypha in  - "a pillar of salt standing as a monument to an unbelieving soul."

Popular culture
The poem, "Lot's Wife" by Anna Akhmatova, offers a more compassionate approach to Lot's wife's decision to look behind her. Scott Cairns' poem, "The Turning of Lot's Wife", also reimagines the story from a feminist perspective. In the first chapter of Slaughter House Five by Kurt Vonnegut, the author praises Lot’s wife for looking back knowing it would destroy her. Vonnegut compares her looking at Sodom to his recalling the fire bombing of Dresden.

The story of Lot's wife is paralleled in Shirley Jackson's short story "Pillar of Salt", in which a woman visiting New York with her husband becomes obsessed with the crumbling of the city.

The musical Caroline, or Change features a climactic aria titled "Lot's Wife," which Tonya Pinkins performed at the 58th Tony Awards to represent the original Broadway production's Best Musical nomination. The song alludes to the story of Lot's wife as a release from the evil and heartache of life.

Gallery

See also 
 Baucis and Philemon
 Lot's Wife (crag)
 Niobe
 Orpheus
 The Needles
 Vayeira
 List of names for the biblical nameless

References

External link 

Family of Abraham
Lot (biblical person)
Unnamed people of the Bible
Women in the Hebrew Bible
Vayeira
Gospel of Luke